Sigifred of Lucca (also Sigefred, Siegfried) (died after 940) was a Lombard nobleman and the progenitor of the House of Canossa. 

Donizo, the 12th-century biographer of the Canossa dynasty, refers to Sigifred as coming from ‘the county of Lucca’ (de comitatu Lucensis). Little is known about Sigifred. Although he was from Lucca, he was probably not count of Lucca. He moved from Tuscany to Emilia-Romagna c.924-930  when Hugh of Italy endowed him with lands around Parma. Sigifred also gained control of lands around Brescia. 

With his wife, whose identity is not known, Sigifred had at least three sons: 
Adalbert Atto of Canossa
Sigifred, progenitor of the Baratti dynasty
Gerard, progenitor of the Guiberti dynasty

References
Donizo of Canossa, Vita Mathildis in Donizonis Vita Mathildis, ed. L. Bethmann, MGH SS 12 (Hannover, 1856), pp. 348-409, accessible online at: Monumenta Germaniae Historica (in Latin)
M. G. Bertolini, 'Note di genealogia e storia Canossiana,' in: I ceti dirigenti in Toscana nell'età precomunale, Atti del 1º Convegno di studi sulla storia dei ceti dirigenti in Toscana - Firenze - 2 dicembre 1978, (Pisa, 1981), pp. 110-149.
M.G. Bertolini, 'Adalberto Azzo di Canossa,' in Dizionario Biografico degli Italiani Volume 1 (1960)

See also 
Republic of Venice, were ended the Silk Road
Charlemagne, who banned usury to the Christian.
Florence, finance center of Europe Medieval Bankers with Venetian gold until 1440 Black Death.

External links
Siegfried I, Herr von Canossa

Notes

House of Canossa
10th-century Italian nobility
People from Lucca